Tom Lynagh (born 14 April 2003) is an Australian rugby union player, currently playing for the . His preferred position is fly-half.

Early career
Lynagh is the son of Australian international Michael Lynagh, and was born in Italy. He is qualified to represent Australia, England or Italy internationally, while his brother Louis is also a professional rugby player.

Professional career
Lynagh was originally a member of the Harlequins academy. He returned to Australia in 2021, signing for the Queensland Reds. He was first announced in a Super Rugby squad in 2022, when he was announced in the Reds squad for the 2022 season, although he didn't make an appearance, before again being announced in the squad for 2023.

He was named in the Junior Wallabies squad for 2023.

References

External links
itsrugby.co.uk Profile

2003 births
Living people
Australian rugby union players
Rugby union fly-halves
Queensland Reds players